Magnipterygius is an extinct genus of primitive ichthyosaur found in the Early Jurassic (Lower Toarcian) Posidonia Shale of Dotternhausen, Germany. The holotype specimen is SMNS96922, a nearly complete articulated skeleton. This genus is well known as a small-sized Ichthyosaur, of around 120 cm length, making it the second genus of that size after the Triassic. Due to the similarities with the genus Stenopterygius it has been classified as a member of the family Stenopterygiidae.

Discovery and naming
The holotype specimen was uncovered in 2011 in the quarry of Holcim, Dotternhausen, with the consent of the State Museum of Natural History Stuttgart. It was recovered all except the tail, left in a block in situ. The preparation was done with air abrasive, using chemically clean iron power at low pressure. During the examination the specimen was found to represent a completely new genus of Ichthyosaur, and was named Magnipterygius huenei, with the genus name being a reference to the Warcraft videogame franchise, specifically to the dwarven king Magni Bronzebeard, while the species honors Friedrich Freiherr von Huene and his dedication to the study of the Posidonia Shale fauna.

References

Early Jurassic ichthyosaurs
Ichthyosaurs of Europe
Toarcian life
Jurassic Germany
Fossils of Germany
Posidonia Shale
Fossil taxa described in 2022